Santiago Manuin Valera (1 January 1957 – 1 July 2020) was a Peruvian human rights activist and indigenous leader.

He was born in Condorcanqui Province, Peru. He was a key leader of the Aguaruna people in Peru. He was President of the Committee for the Struggle for Respect for Indigenous Peoples of Condorcanqui.

He was a critic of the Túpac Amaru Revolutionary Movement. During a police crackdown on dissenters in 2009, he was shot, but survived the encounter. He and other activists were blocking a road to protest the destruction of the Amazon rainforest. Several dozen people were killed during the conflict with the police.

Manuin Valera died on 1 July 2020 from COVID-19 during the COVID-19 pandemic in Peru in Chiclayo, Peru at the age of 63.

References

1957 births
2020 deaths
Peruvian politicians
Peruvian human rights activists
Peruvian people of indigenous peoples descent
People from Condorcanqui Province
Deaths from the COVID-19 pandemic in Peru